St Helens is a town in the Metropolitan Borough of St Helens, Merseyside, England.  The unparished area contains 67 buildings that are recorded in the National Heritage List for England as designated listed buildings. Of these, one is listed at Grade I, the highest grade, five are listed at Grade II*, the middle of the three grades, and the others are at Grade II, the lowest grade.  The main town in the district is St Helens, the others being Newton-le-Willows and Earlestown.  Until the Industrial Revolution, the area was largely rural.  Coal mining began in the 16th century, but modern industrial development began with the construction of the Sankey Canal in the late 18th century, linking St Helens with the River Mersey.  The early 19th century saw new industries, including copper smelting, production of alkali, and the manufacture of glass.  Of these, the major industry was glass making, the main business being that of Pilkingtons.  The first major railway line in the world, the Liverpool and Manchester Railway was built through the district, opening in 1830.

The listed buildings in the district reflect its history.  The earlier history is reflected by farmhouses and farm buildings, houses and cottages, and country houses, together with churches and associated structures.  Structures associated with the Sankey Canal include locks and bridges.  Associated with the railway are viaducts, a tunnel, a bridge, and stations.  The later listed buildings include structures associated with glass industry, churches, public buildings, a war memorial, and a statue of Queen Victoria

Key

Buildings

References
Citations

Sources

Listed buildings in Merseyside
Lists of listed buildings in Merseyside
Listed